Alessandro Bonetti (born 10 April 1985 in Trento) is an Italian racing driver. He has competed in such series as International GT Open and the Formula Renault 3.5 Series. He has won races in both the 3000 Pro Series and Le Mans Series.

Racing record

Complete Formula Renault 3.5 Series results
(key) (Races in bold indicate pole position) (Races in italics indicate fastest lap)

† Driver did not finish the race, but was classified as he completed more than 90% of the race distance.

References

External links
 Official website
 Career statistics from Driver Database

1985 births
Living people
Sportspeople from Trento
Italian racing drivers
Italian Formula Renault 1.6 drivers
Italian Formula Three Championship drivers
European Le Mans Series drivers
World Series Formula V8 3.5 drivers
Blancpain Endurance Series drivers
International GT Open drivers
24 Hours of Spa drivers

Jenzer Motorsport drivers
Draco Racing drivers
AF Corse drivers